Zhufu Yan (主父偃, died 127 or 126 BCE) was a Chinese politician who served as a high-ranking court official and advisor to Emperor Wu of Han. He proposed the Tui'en Ling (推恩令 ‘Order to Expand Favours’), a decree that was meant to weaken the power of the feudal lords in China. The policy encouraged them to divide their territories among all their sons rather than pass their lands onto just the eldest son. The resulting fragmentation of the feudal lords' estates reduced their influence, making them less of a threat to the Emperor.

Born into a poor family in Shandong, Zhufu began his studies with the School of Diplomacy and did not study Taoist and Confucian texts until later.

It was said that Zhufu accepted many bribes and was notorious for revealing the secrets of many court officials.

He once manipulated Zhu Maichen into accepting a proposal made by Gongsun Hong, but Gongsun was able to convince the Emperor to execute Zhufu Yan for bribery.

References

2nd-century BC executions
127 BC deaths
Executed Han dynasty people
Executed people from Shandong
Han dynasty politicians from Shandong
People executed by the Han dynasty
Politicians from Zibo
Victims of familial execution
Year of birth unknown
Chinese reformers